Rotkreuzplatz is an U-Bahn station in Munich, Germany, on the U1. It was opened on 28 May 1983, the extension onwards to Westfriedhof was not opened until 1998. The station is also served by route  of the Munich tramway.

References

Munich U-Bahn stations
Railway stations in Germany opened in 1983
Buildings and structures completed in 1983
1983 establishments in West Germany